Bearpaw Meadow High Sierra Camp is a full-service tent campground in Sequoia National Park. It was established in 1934.  The camp was listed on the National Register of Historic Places in 2016.

Weather permitting, it is open mid June to mid September. It is about 12 miles east of Giant Forest on the High Sierra Trail.

See also
National Register of Historic Places listings in Tulare County, California

References

External links

 NPS web site about the High Sierra Trail

Sequoia National Park
Campgrounds in California
National Register of Historic Places in Sequoia National Park
1934 establishments in California
Temporary populated places on the National Register of Historic Places